Marie Édouard Magnien (Montfort-l'Amaury, 4 July 1795 – Versailles, after 1864) was a 19th-century French homme de lettres.

Biography 
The son of a lawyer in Parliament, Stéphane Mallarmé's great-great-cousin, a tutor in the Sarthe department, he is mostly known for his Pétition à la Chambre des Députés, sur la conservation des monuments français in 1826 and his participation in the writing of the play Le Secret d'état (1831) by Eugène Sue and Ferdinand de Villeneuve.

A founding member of the Société des Sciences naturelle, he resigned in 1864.

Works 
1821: L'Ode au sommeil, ode
1826: Pétition à la Chambre des Députés, sur la conservation des monuments français
1831: Le Secret d'état, comédie en vaudevilles in 1 act, with Eugène Sue and Ferdinand de Villeneuve
1836: Mortel, ange ou démon, 2 vols., collection of poems
1836: Excursions en Espagne ou chroniques provinciales de la péninsule
1841: Épître à un centenaire, 1841 
1851: Notice nécrologique sur M. Adolphe Veytard

Bibliography 
 Revue de l'Histoire de Versailles et de Seine-et-Oise, 1968,

References

External links 
 Édouard Magnien on data.bnf.fr

19th-century French writers
People from Yvelines
1795 births
Year of death missing